Kahang (also Romanized as Kohang; also known as Kohank) is a village in Barzavand Rural District, in the Central District of Ardestan County, Isfahan Province, Iran. At the 2006 census, its population was 854, in 259 families.

References 

Populated places in Ardestan County